James Henry Donnelly (January 6, 1867 – December 31, 1933) was a Major League Baseball third baseman for the Union Association's Kansas City Cowboys in . His statistics are often included with those of Jim Donnelly, though the two were separate players.

Donnelly played in the minor leagues with the Minneapolis Millers and for a team in Lynn, Massachusetts, before signing with Kansas City. From , he managed the semi-pro Cambridge Reds. Off-season, he worked as a bookkeeper in Boston's Clinton Market.

References

Sources

 Statistics at Baseball Almanac

Major League Baseball third basemen
Kansas City Cowboys (UA) players
Baseball players from Massachusetts
1867 births
1933 deaths
19th-century baseball players
Minor league baseball managers
Muskegon (minor league baseball) players
Lynn (minor league baseball) players
Sterling (minor league baseball) players
Galesburg (minor league baseball) players
Burlington (minor league baseball) players